Stoney Point (Le Cunff) Airport  is located adjacent to Stoney Point, Ontario, Canada.

References

Registered aerodromes in Essex County, Ontario